Captain of the People (Lombard: Capitani del Popol) was an administrative title used in Italy during the Middle Ages, established essentially to balance the power and authority of the noble families of the Italian city-states.

History 
It was created in the early 13th century when the populares, the increasingly wealthy classes of commoners (merchants, professionals, craftsmen and, in maritime cities, ship-owners) began to acquire roles in the communal administration of various Italian city-states, and needed a municipal officeholder able to counter the political power of the nobles (called potentes), represented usually by the podestà (a title used for chief magistrates and other top administrators in medieval Italian cities). One of the first capitani del popolo was created in Bologna in northern Italy, appointed in 1228.

The capitano del popolo exercised control of the podestà, sometimes flanked by two autonomous councils with representatives of local guilds of artisans and craftsmen and the gonfalonieri, leaders of military units connected with city's parishes.

In the Republic of Florence, a capitano del popolo existed from 1250 as part of the attempt to free the city from the rule of Frederick II. 

Such office also existed in the early stages of the Republic of Genoa, that elected Guglielmo Boccanegra as its first Capitano del popolo in 1257.

Towards the second half of the 13th century, however, the communal title of Capitano del popolo became a breeding ground for despotism and hereditary lordship. By gaining control of the election process for choosing the title-holder, many influential families (including aristocrats that the establishment of this office had contributed to keeping out of power) gained control over their cities and towns of residence, thus assuring their long-lasting influence and progressively transforming the Comune into a Signoria (i.e. lordship).

References

Bibliography
 

Gubernatorial titles

Medieval Italy
2nd millennium in Italy
Legal history of Italy